Bas Veenstra (born 7 June 1995) is a Dutch professional basketball player. Veenstra usually plays as power forward and occasionally as center or small forward.

Professional career
Veenstra started his professional career with his hometown team Landstede Basketbal.

He missed the 2013–14 season, because of a knee injury.

In July 2014, Veenstra signed a 1-year deal with Donar Groningen. In June 2015, he extended his contract with 2 years.

In July 2018, Veenstra signed a one-year contract with Aris Leeuwarden.

Honours
Donar
Dutch Basketball League (2): 2015–16, 2016-17
NBB Cup (2): 2014–15, 2016–17
Dutch Basketball Supercup (2): 2015, 2016

References

1995 births
Living people
Dutch men's basketball players
Power forwards (basketball)
Donar (basketball club) players
Landstede Hammers players
Aris Leeuwarden players
Dutch Basketball League players
Sportspeople from Zwolle